Ibrahim Rojas Blanco (born October 10, 1975 in Santa Cruz del Sur, Camagüey) is a Cuban sprint canoeist who competed from the late 1990s to the mid-2000s.

In 2001 he and partner Leobaldo Pereira won Cuba's first-ever world championship gold medal. In all Rojas won three world titles and was Pan American champion four times. He also won silver medals at both the Sydney and Athens Olympics.

All his medals came in the two-man (C-2) Canadian canoe discipline, first with Pereira and  later with Ledis Balceiro. Rojas would win eight world championship medals in his career.

References

1975 births
Living people
People from Santa Cruz del Sur
Cuban male canoeists
Canoeists at the 2000 Summer Olympics
Canoeists at the 2004 Summer Olympics
Olympic canoeists of Cuba
Olympic silver medalists for Cuba
Olympic medalists in canoeing
ICF Canoe Sprint World Championships medalists in Canadian
Medalists at the 2004 Summer Olympics
Medalists at the 2000 Summer Olympics
Pan American Games gold medalists for Cuba
Pan American Games medalists in canoeing
Canoeists at the 2003 Pan American Games
Medalists at the 2003 Pan American Games
21st-century Cuban people
20th-century Cuban people